Brigadier General Nibal Madhat Badr is a Syrian army officer.

Badr is originally from the port city of Tartus.  On 1 July 2017 she was appointed to the rank of Brigadier General and became the first female general officer in the Syrian Armed Forces.  It came at a time of accelerated integration of women into the Syrian military and police forces, during the ongoing Syrian Civil War.

References 

Syrian generals
Female army generals
People from Tartus